Verwaltungsgerichtshof may refer to:

Supreme Administrative Court (Austria)
a high administrative court in the Judiciary of Germany